Sir John Hall   (born 21 March 1933) is a property developer in North East England. He is also life president and former chairman of Newcastle United Football Club.

Biography 

The son of a miner, Hall was born and brought up in North Seaton, Ashington, Northumberland, and he attended nearby Bedlington Grammar School until 1949. Before starting his own business career, he worked in the mining industry as a surveyor.

In the 1980s, Hall's company, Cameron Hall Developments, masterminded the construction of the MetroCentre shopping mall in Dunston, Gateshead.

Hall's company bought Woolsington Hall, northwest of Newcastle, in 1994. Hall has planned several developments of the site, including a football academy and a luxury hotel with golf course. In 2002, the hall was added to English Heritage's Heritage at Risk Register and, as of 2021, is vacant following fire damage and requiring full restoration.

In April 2010, Hall announced that he was suffering from inoperable prostate cancer and was about to embark on a course of intensive chemotherapy. As of February 2011, the cancer was being kept under control by medication and Hall was concentrating on his final project, a £2.5-million rose garden at his Wynyard Park estate.

On 10 February 2011, at a ceremony at the Shipley Art Gallery, Hall and his wife were given the freedom of Gateshead for their services to leisure, retail, business and sport.

Newcastle United Football Club 

Hall began his ownership of the team by taking over Newcastle United in a bitter battle for control and appointing Kevin Keegan as manager in February 1992. Keegan turned the club's fortunes around, taking the team from the brink of relegation into the Third Division, to competing with Manchester United for the Premier League in 1996.

After taking over Newcastle United, Hall announced his intention to create a "sporting club" along similar lines to multi-sport institutions in Europe such as FC Barcelona. To this end he also bought the Newcastle Falcons (rugby union), the Newcastle Eagles (basketball), and the Durham Wasps (ice hockey) in 1995. The Wasps were subsequently moved to Sunderland's Crowtree Leisure Centre. They were renamed the Newcastle Cobras when they moved to Newcastle Arena the following season.

Hall planned to build a new rugby, football and ice-skating stadium at Leazes Park but the scheme was rejected after a 38,000-signature petition against it was organised by local residents. Instead, he began rebuilding St James' Park, Newcastle United's stadium, where the Leazes End stand is now the Sir John Hall Stand. Although he proved very popular with the club's fans, questions as to whether his involvement with Newcastle United was anything other than profitable opportunism have been raised.

In 1997, Hall passed chairmanship of the club to Freddy Shepherd and his family interests in the club to his son, Douglas. He then sold his entire 41.6% shareholding to sports retail magnate Mike Ashley for £55 million on 23 May 2007, valuing the club at £133.1 million.

Politics
Hall has donated more than £500,000 to the Conservative Party, and helped to fund Theresa May's snap general election in 2017. In May 2017 he gave £25,000 to the Conservative Party. In February 2018, he expressed disapproval over what he described as May's indecisiveness about Brexit and her lack of domestic policies.

References 

1933 births
Living people
People from Ashington
Newcastle United F.C. directors and chairmen
Newcastle Falcons
Deputy Lieutenants of Durham
Knights Bachelor
English rugby union chairmen and investors
People educated at Bedlingtonshire Community High School
Newcastle Eagles
Conservative Party (UK) donors